Reef Live is a concert video release by rock band Reef from the 2003 "Together Tour". Recorded on Saturday, March 19, 2003 at the Carling Academy, it was released in 2003 on DVD.

Track listing
 "Good Feeling" 
 "I Would Have Left You"
 "Come Back Brighter"
 "Lucky Number"
 "Place Your Hands"
 "Set the Record Straight"
 "Talk to Me"
 "Saturday"
 "Stone for Your Love" 
 "Don't You Like It?"
 "Summer's In Bloom"
 "Who You Are" (titled as "Who Are You?")
 "Lately Stomping" 
 "Yer Old"
 "End"
 "Give Me Your Love"
 "Waster"
 "Naked"

Extra features

 Behind the Scenes documentary
 Photo gallery
 10 Bonus Video Clips
 Waster
 Good Feeling
 Consideration
 Give Me Your Love
 Weird
 Yer Old
 Place Your Hands
 Naked
 Come Back Brighter
 New Bird

2003 video albums
Reef (band) video albums